Tamukkam Ground (Tamukkam maidanam) is located in Tallakulam in Madurai, Tamil Nadu. Historically this ground was developed by Viswanatha Nayak, first king of the Madurai Nayak Dynasty, and Ariyanatha Mudaliyar and used for hosting royal entertainments, sports events and for display of martial arts. Experts in different martial arts such as silambu, sword fight, etc., used to display their prowess at this ground. Similarly, sports events such as horse race, bull-fight, elephant race, etc., were also organised here. This Ground also called as Gandhi Museum Ground since it is located near to the Gandhi Memorial Museum Madurai.

Public carnivals
This is the important landmark in the city and because of its size and location, has become the most-preferred venue among the public for holding big conclaves. Now, it is maintained by the Corporation of Madurai and is being rented for government and private functions generating good revenue to the civic body.  Total Area covers nearly 50000 sq.ft., including the Kalaiarangam, an in-built theatre meant for organising cultural functions and other meetings. The Tamukkam can accommodate more than 1.5 lakh people and the Kalaiarangam nearly 20,000 persons. Some of the well known annual public events are Chithirai Exhibition between April–May, Chamber Trade Fair, MADITSSIA industrial Exhibition

See also
 Tamukkam Palace

References
 

Buildings and structures in Madurai
Maidans in India
Sports venues in Tamil Nadu
Year of establishment missing